The Findlay Toyota Center (formerly Tim's Toyota Center and originally built as the Prescott Valley Convention & Events Center) is a 5,100-seat multi-purpose arena located at 3201 North Main Street in Prescott Valley, Arizona.

Since opening in November 2006, it is home to a variety of Arizona Interscholastic Association basketball and wrestling competitions; for instance, in 2011, it hosted the 1A and 2A Conference semifinal and finals games and the 3A Conference quarterfinals. It has also hosted a few monster truck shows.

The arena hosted the American Indoor Football's Arizona Outlaws in 2012 and the Central Hockey League's Arizona Sundogs from 2006 to 2014.

Tim's Toyota, a Toyota dealership in Prescott with used car lots in Prescott Valley and Chino Valley, paid an undisclosed sum to be the corporate sponsor and namesake of the arena.  That deal expired on September 30, 2014, with the arena reverting to the Prescott Valley Event Center name.

On January 3, 2019, Findlay Toyota Prescott (formally Tim's Toyota) acquired the naming rights to the center for an undisclosed sum. (http://www.findlaytoyotacenter.com/news/we-have-a-new-name)

Features
Among its amenities are 24 luxury suites (including two party suites), 400 club seats and parking for 3,000 cars. The arena accommodates up to 6,200 for concerts.

Events
The venue has hosted well-known bands such as Toby Keith, Cody Johnson, Miranda Lambert, Chicago, Godsmack, Breaking Benjamin, Three Doors Down, and ZZ Top. It hosted its first-ever WWE event on July 29, 2007. 

The venue hosted a college basketball game on November 30, 2011, when Brigham Young University faced Northern Arizona.

On April 11, 2016, it was announced that the Phoenix Suns would own their affiliate in the NBA Development League, the Northern Arizona Suns, after the purchasing the Bakersfield Jam, relocating the team from Bakersfield, California, to Prescott Valley for the 2016–17 season. Following the pandemic-shorted 2019–20 season, the Phoenix Suns announced that the Northern Arizona Suns would relocate to the metro Phoenix area for the following season.

See also
 List of sports venues with the name Toyota

References

External links
 Official site

Indoor arenas in Arizona
Indoor ice hockey venues in the United States
Music venues in Arizona
NBA G League venues
Northern Arizona Suns
Sports venues in Arizona
Buildings and structures in Prescott, Arizona
Tourist attractions in Yavapai County, Arizona
Sports venues completed in 2006
2006 establishments in Arizona